Samuel Mayer "Max" Saltsman (29 May 1921 – 28 November 1985) was a Canadian businessman and politician for the social-democratic New Democratic Party, and served as a Member of Parliament (MP) for the Waterloo South, Waterloo and Waterloo–Cambridge electoral districts from 1964-1979. He resigned from federal politics in 1979 and worked as a policy advisor until shortly before his death in 1985.

Early life and education
The son of Samuel and Sara (née Krier) Saltsman, he was born Samuel Mayer Saltsman on 29 May 1921 in Toronto, but was known as "Max" since he was a child. Saltsman was educated in Spadina-area schools, finally leaving Central Technical School at 14 to get a job to support his family. He studied part-time after work hours and eventually earned his high school credits. Saltsman never completed university, but did take courses on and off since he started correspondence courses while serving in the Royal Canadian Air Force (RCAF), and continued on through to his years in parliament.  Saltsman served in France, the Netherlands, and Germany with the RCAF during World War II. In 1947, he married Dorothy Gellman. He was president of Galt Dry Cleaning Services and Eastern Coin Operated Enterprise.

Career in politics
He was first elected to the House of Commons in a 1964 by-election held following the death of MP Gordon Chaplin, and was re-elected in the general elections of 1965, 1968, 1972, and 1974. Saltsman was the NDP critic for Finance and National Revenue from 1976 to 1977. Saltsman drafted private member's bill C-249, ""An Act Respecting a Proposed Association Between Canada and the Caribbean Turks and Caicos Islands" that proposed that Canada form an association with the Turks and Caicos Islands; however, it was never submitted to a vote.

Prior to federal office, he was an alderman in Galt, Ontario from 1961 to 1964. In 1982, Bill Davis, Premier of Ontario, named him to the province's Inflation Restraint Board. Saltsman planned to return to municipal politics as a councillor-at-large for Cambridge in 1985 but cancelled these plans at a public news conference on 21 October, where he announced he was diagnosed with terminal liver cancer. Saltsman died in Toronto's Wellesley Hospital on 28 November, two weeks after the Cambridge municipal election was held.

Electoral record

Archives 
There is a Max Saltsman fonds at Library and Archives Canada. Archival reference number is R3300.

References 

1921 births
1985 deaths
Deaths from cancer in Ontario
Deaths from liver cancer
Jewish Canadian politicians
Members of the House of Commons of Canada from Ontario
New Democratic Party MPs
Politicians from Toronto
University of Western Ontario alumni
University of Waterloo alumni